Johnny Cash Sings with the B.C. Goodpasture Christian School is a 1979 Johnny Cash album recorded with the students of the B.C. Goodpasture Christian School. Cash re-recorded many gospel songs he had previously recorded and the students' voices were dubbed onto Cash's vocals. The album was released in 1979 and has become very rare.

Track listing

Personnel
Adapted from the album liner notes.

Performance
Harold Bradley – dobro, guitar, bass guitar, banjo (all tracks)
Johnny Cash – lead vocals (side one, tracks 1-3; side two, tracks 1–6)
Goodpasture Christian School Chorus – vocals (side two, tracks 1–6)
Julie Biffle, Hal Balthrop, Brandy Boone, Beth Bradshaw, Jeff Burnette, Jeff Carnahan, Jim Carney, Cecily Duncan, Deidra Elwell, Kerry Grant, Kim Hoover, Rachel Hosse, Alisa Jones, Karen Jones, Kevin Kolbe, Chuck Odom, Lisa Odum, Lynne Rye, Vicky Stewart, Kitty Taylor, Brian Waite, Lisa Williams, Paul Wingfield, Paula Young
Goodpasture Christian School Concert Band – instrumentation (side one, tracks 1–4)
Goodpasture Christian School Stage Band – instrumentation (side one, tracks 1–4)
Brass: Keith Beck, trumpet; Brian Bennett, trombone; Mike Connor, trumpet; Eddie Slowey, trumpet; Marty Williams, trumpet
Rhythm: Anne Fottrell, piano; Kip Raines, drums; Alan Rice, bass guitar; Johnny Sturdivant, guitar
Woodwinds: Emily Boyd, tenor sax and flute; Carl Eidson, alto and baritone sax; Lisa Odum, tenor sax; Lisa Williams, alto sax
Richard VanDyke – Goodpasture Music Director

Production
Ken Laxton – recording engineer (Columbia Recording Studios) (side one)
Bill Linneman – recording engineer (Hilltop Studios) (side two)

Other personnel
John Hayes – poster and back cover photos
Precision Record Pressing – pressing
Chip Schofield – front cover photo
Woodland Studios – mastering (all tracks)

References

Johnny Cash albums
1980 albums